Sarah McAnulty is an American squid biologist and science communicator. She is the founder of Skype a Scientist, a non-profit organization that connects scientists and teachers around the world for live video calls.

Education 
McAnulty earned a bachelor's degree in marine science at Boston University in 2011. McAnulty got her PhD from the Department of Molecular and Cell Biology at the University of Connecticut, graduating in 2019. She studied immunology in cephalopods, focusing on Hawaiian bobtail squid.

Career 
McAnulty founded Skype a Scientist in 2017 as a way to increase both trust in scientists and science literacy.

In 2019, McAnulty went on a road trip in the southeastern US, called the "Squids Across America Tour," where she spoke about cephalopods and science communication. She has also led trips for Atlas Obscura in Hawaii.

In April 2019, Sarah McAnulty led a video effort by a team of women who criticised Discovery's response to science through song. Their response was a lip-synched music video set to Let Me Blow Ya Mind, and portrayed a diverse bunch of women doing science, demonstrating that science is for everyone. 

After graduating from UConn, McAnulty became a Research Assistant Professor in the same department. She is simultaneously continuing to run Skype a Scientist.

McAnulty published a squid coloring book in 2018. She is an expert in cephalopods and social media.

References 

University of Connecticut alumni
University of Connecticut faculty
Boston University alumni
Science communicators
Living people
Year of birth missing (living people)